Schlupp vom grünen Stern (lit.: Schlupp from the green star) is a German television series. Originally a 1974 children's book by Ellis Kaut, the story was adapted as a marionette play filmed in four half-hour episodes by Augsburger Puppenkiste in 1986.  In 1987 four further episodes titled Schlupp vom grünen Stern – Neue Abenteuer auf Terra (Schlupp from the green star - New adventures on Terra) followed.

See also
List of German television series

External links
 

German television shows featuring puppetry
German children's television series
Television shows based on children's books
1986 German television series debuts
1987 German television series endings
German-language television shows
Das Erste original programming